Waka may refer to:

Culture and language
 Waka (canoe), a Polynesian word for canoe; especially, canoes of the Māori of New Zealand
 Waka ama, a Polynesian outrigger canoe
 Waka hourua, a Polynesian ocean-going canoe
 Waka taua, a Māori war canoe
 Waka hurdling, a traditional Māori sport of jumping over canoes
 Waka huia, a Māori treasure box
 Waka (mythology), a Hawaiian lizard goddess
 Waka language, an Adamawa language of Nigeria
 Huaca or wak'a, in the Quechua language, a class of sacred objects

Arts and entertainment
 Waka (poetry), a genre of Japanese poetry
 WAKA (TV), a television station licensed to Selma, Alabama, US
 Waka music, a musical genre from Yorubaland of Nigeria
 Waga sculpture or waka, a type of Ethiopian memorial statue
 "Waka" (Diamond Platnumz song), 2017
 "Waka", song by 6ix9ine from Dummy Boy, 2018
 Waka, a character in the video game Ōkami

Places
 Waka, Texas, a community in the Texas Panhandle
 El Perú (Maya site) or Waka', Maya ruins in Guatemala
 Waka National Park, a national park in central Gabon
 Waka P'iqi, a mountain in Bolivia

People with the name
 Waka Attewell, New Zealand cinematographer
 Waka Flocka Flame (born 1986), American rapper
 Waka Goi (born 1968), Papua New Guinea politician
 Waka Inoue (born 1980), Japanese tarento and actress
 Waka Kobori (born 2000), Japanese swimmer
 Waka Nathan (born 1940), New Zealand rugby union player
 Neil Waka, New Zealand broadcaster and journalist
 Yamada Waka (1879–1957), Japanese feminist and social reformer

Other uses
 Cyclone Waka, a 2001 tropical cyclone
 World Adult Kickball Association
 Waka-jumping, a term used in New Zealand for politicians switching party allegiance while in office

See also
Waka waka (disambiguation), including uses of Wakawaka

Wakka (disambiguation)

Japanese feminine given names